Intelligent Robotics Group (IRG) is a division of the Ames Research Center at Moffett Federal Airfield in California's Silicon Valley.

Description
The 2009 Director of the Intelligent Robotics Group Terry Fong stated in an interview that

See also
 Artificial intelligence
 Programming
 History of robots

References

External links 
   gigapan of the IRG By:Rich Gibson (Rich) on October 29, 2008 (system developed by Carnegie Mellon University)  interactive internal view of  laboratory at IRG  retrieved 19:47(GMT) (in situ)24.10.2011
 Kristen Stubbs and Illah Nourbakhsh   "An Analysis of the Intelligent Robotics Group's Experience with the Mars Exploration Rover Mission,"    BibTeX Reference : @techreport { CMU-RI-TR-04-45  Stubbs_2004_4777 (September "2004")   Abstract:  IRG at Carnegie Mellon University (Pittsburgh, PA) aiding mission  processes for Mars exploration

Robotics organizations
History of artificial intelligence
Ames Research Center